Rafael Gilberto Morgan Álvarez (born 22 November 1945) is a Mexican politician affiliated with the National Action Party. He served as Senator of the LVIII and LIX Legislatures of the Mexican Congress representing Baja California and as Deputy of the LI and LV Legislatures.

References

1945 births
Living people
Politicians from Sinaloa
Politicians from Baja California
Members of the Senate of the Republic (Mexico)
Members of the Chamber of Deputies (Mexico)
National Action Party (Mexico) politicians
20th-century Mexican politicians
21st-century Mexican politicians
People from Cosalá Municipality